Hedvig Gustava Albertina, Baroness de Staël-Holstein or simply Albertine (1797–1838), was the daughter of Erik Magnus Staël von Holstein and Madame de Staël, the granddaughter of Jacques Necker and Suzanne Curchod, wife to Victor de Broglie (1785–1870), and mother to Albert, a French monarchist politician, and Louise, a novelist and biographer. Her biological father may have been the author Benjamin Constant.

Life

Albertina, still very much part of the de Staël circle, shared her grandfather's anglomania, and introduced her husband to the "erudite society that centred around that family." Victor de Broglie Souvenirs recall their married life and the political storms that surrounded it.

Her letters were collected and edited by her son Albert and published in French and in English by Robert Baird as Transplanted flowers, or memoirs of Mrs. Rumpff, daughter of John Jacob Astor, Esq. and the Duchess de Broglie, daughter of Madame de Stael (1846).

References

1797 births
1838 deaths
Spouses of prime ministers of France